Amona may refer to:

Places
Amona, Goa, a village in Goa, India
Amona, Mateh Binyamin, an Israeli outpost in the central West Bank
Isla de Mona, known in the pre-Columbian era as Amona

Other
"Amona", a song on the album Necessary Evil by Israeli band Salem
Asteia amona, an Asteiidae species of fly